"Monday Morning" is a 1975 song written and sung by Fleetwood Mac guitarist Lindsey Buckingham. It is the first track from the multi-platinum, second eponymous album Fleetwood Mac. The song was later included on the band's 2002 compilation album, The Very Best of Fleetwood Mac. Reviewer Matthew Greenwald of AllMusic described the song as "a brilliant opening to a brilliant album" which he attributed to Buckingham's "strong pop instincts and craftsmanship".

Background
Like "Rhiannon" and "I'm So Afraid", "Monday Morning" was intended for a second Buckingham Nicks LP, but the album never came to fruition as their label, Polydor Records, dropped the duo from their roster before they could record a follow-up. The three aforementioned songs were presented to the rest of Fleetwood Mac on Buckingham's 4-track tape machine during the 1975 recording sessions of Fleetwood Mac. While drummer Mick Fleetwood immediately took a liking to the demos, bassist John McVie was initially hesitant to venture away from the band's blues roots. Producer Keith Olsen convinced McVie that the band would be more successful embracing pop rock, quipping, "It’s a much faster way to the bank".

During live performances from 1975-1978, Buckingham performed an intro that would later become the melody of "Tusk". The song was performed on all of the band's tours from 1975 to 1978. The song reappeared on the Unleashed Tour in 2009 and later the An Evening with Fleetwood Mac Tour in 2018-2019.

Personnel
Mick Fleetwood – drums
John McVie – bass guitar
Christine McVie – keyboards
Lindsey Buckingham – acoustic guitars, electric guitars, lead and backing vocals
Stevie Nicks – backing vocals

References

1975 songs
Fleetwood Mac songs
1976 singles
Warner Records singles
Songs written by Lindsey Buckingham